A dynastic union is a type of union with only two different states that are governed under the same dynasty, with their boundaries, their laws, and their interests remaining distinct from each other.

Historical examples

Union of Kingdom of Aragon and Kingdom of Navarre

With the assassination of Sancho IV, Navarre was invaded by his cousins Alfonso VI of Castile and Sancho V Ramirez of Aragon, and the latter was made king in 1076, which led to more than half a century (1076–1134) of Aragonese control.

Union of Kingdom of Aragon and County of Barcelona

Marriage of Count of Barcelona Raymond Berengar IV of Barcelona and future Queen of Aragon Petronila of Aragon in 1137 that formed the Crown of Aragon.

Spain (Union of Castile and Aragon)

Marriage of Isabella I of Castile and Ferdinand II of Aragon in 1469 that laid the foundations for the kingdom of Spain. They did not ascend to their respective thrones until 1474 and 1479 respectively.

Iberian Union (Union of Spain and Portugal)

Dynastic union between Spain (the union between the Crowns of Castile and Aragon) and Portugal (1580–1640), generally called the Iberian Union by modern historians, under the Philippine Dynasty.

Union of Grand Duchy of Lithuania and Kingdom of Poland

Marriage of Jogaila and Queen Jadwiga of Poland on 1385, generally called the Union of Krewo. That union laid the foundations for the eventual formation of the Polish–Lithuanian Commonwealth.

Union of Kingdom of France and Kingdom of Navarre

Following Salic law, Henry III, King of Navarre, a member of the House of Bourbon, succeeded to the French throne in 1589 upon the extinction of the male line of the House of Valois. Both houses were cadet branches of the Capetian dynasty, the ruling house of the kingdom of France since 987.

Union of Kingdom of Scotland and Kingdom of France 

Norman or French culture first gained a foothold in Scotland during the Davidian Revolution, when King David I introduced Continental-style reforms throughout all aspects of Scottish life: social, religious, economic and administrative. He also invited immigrant French and Anglo-French peoples to Scotland. This effectively created a Franco-Scottish aristocracy, with ties to the French aristocracy as well as many to the Franco-English aristocracy. From the Wars of Scottish Independence, as common enemies of England and its ruling House of Plantagenet, Scotland and France started to enjoy a close diplomatic relationship, the Auld Alliance, from 1295 to 1560. From the Late Middle Ages and into the Early Modern Period Scotland and its burghs also benefited from close economic and trading links with France in addition to its links to the Low Countries, Scandinavia and the Baltic.

The prospect of dynastic union came in the 15th and 16th centuries, when Margaret, eldest daughter of James I of Scotland, married the future Louis XI of France. James V of Scotland married two French brides in succession. His infant daughter, Mary I, succeeded him on his death in 1542. For many years thereafter the country was ruled under a regency led by her French mother, Mary of Guise, who succeeded in marrying her daughter to the future Francis II of France. The young couple were king and queen of France and Scotland from 1559 until Francis died in 1560. Mary returned to a Scotland heaving with political revolt and religious revolution, which made a continuation of the alliance impossible.

Cordial economic and cultural relations did continue however, although throughout the 17th century, the Scottish establishment became increasingly Presbyterian, often belligerent to Roman Catholicism, a facet which was somewhat at odds with Louis XIV's aggressively Catholic foreign and domestic policy. The relationship was further weakened by the Union of the Crowns in 1603, which meant from then on that although still independent, executive power in the Scottish government, the Crown, was shared with the Kingdom of England and Scottish foreign policy came into line more with that of England than with France.

Union of Kingdom of England and Kingdom of Scotland

When Elizabeth I of England died in 1603, the heir to the English Throne was King James VI of Scotland. Generally called the Union of the Crowns, this dynastic union was in place from 1603 until 1653 (when the monarchy was officially abolished) and again from 1659 until the two nations were politically united in 1707.

References

Monarchy
-
Political union